The Devil You Know is a 2013 American mystery thriller film starring Lena Olin and Rosamund Pike. Jennifer Lawrence also appears in the film, playing a younger version of the character portrayed by Pike.

Plot
Kathryn Vale (Lena Olin), a once popular film star, is aiming for a come-back, after having to pause her career after her husband was murdered. Her daughter Zoe Hughes (Rosamund Pike) is trying to follow in her mother's footsteps and attempting to start her own film career. While rumors of Vale's involvement in the unsolved murder are persistent, the rivalry between mother and daughter grows.

Cast
Rosamund Pike as Zoe Hughes
Jennifer Lawrence as Young Zoe
Lena Olin as Kathryn Vale
Dean Winters as Jake Kelly
Molly Price as Edie Fontaine
Bern Cohen as Humphrey Smith
Barbara Garrick as Joan Stone

Production
The film was shot in 2005.

Release
Originally set for a 2007 release, the film was officially released via video on demand on July 9, 2013.

Reception 
IMDb gave it a 3.4 out of 10.

References

External links
 
 

American mystery thriller films
2010s mystery thriller films
2010s English-language films
2010s American films